Kwon Won-il (born June 24, 1995) is a South Korean mixed martial artist who competes in the Bantamweight division of ONE Championship. As of March 6, 2023, he is ranked #4 in the ONE Bantamweight rankings.

Background
Kwon was born on June 24, 1996 in Daejeon, South Korea's fifth-largest city, about 150 kilometers south of the capital of Seoul. His martial arts journey began when he joined his elementary school’s taekwondo team, where he showed natural talent and advanced beyond provincial competitions to participate in the national youth tournament.

However, Kwon was far from a model student. He quit taekwondo when he graduated from elementary school, citing a lack of direction and getting into fights with other students. Eventually, he was ordered to be transferred to another school. After being informed of the news, his mother cried in front of the school's principal, and Kwon was motivated to better himself.

Mixed martial arts career

Early career
Kwon started his professional MMA career in 2014, fighting primarily in South Korea and Japan. He amassed a record of 5–0 prior to his signing with ONE Championship.

ONE Championship
Kwon made his promotional debut against Anthony Engelen on January 19, 2019, at ONE: Eternal Glory. He won the fight via 67 second technical knockout in the first round.

Kwon faced Masakazu Imanari on February 22, 2019, at ONE: Call to Greatness. He lost the fight via a heel hook submission in 53 second from the first round.

Kwon faced former ONE Featherweight World Championship challenger Eric Kelly April 12, 2019, at ONE: Roots of Honor. He won the fight via 19 second technical knockout in the first round.

Kwon faced Koyomi Matsushima on June 15, 2019, at ONE: Legendary Quest. He lost the fight via unanimous decision.

Kwon faced Sunoto Peringkat on October 13, 2019, at ONE: Century – Part 1. He won the fight via technical knockout in the first round.

Kwon faced Shoko Sato on January 31, 2020, at ONE: Fire & Fury. He lost the fight via a rear-naked choke submission in the first round.

Kwon faced Bruno Pucci on October 30, 2020 and aired on November 20, 2022, at ONE: Inside the Matrix 4. He won the fight via technical knockout in the first round.

Kwon faced Chen Rui on January 20, 2021 and aired on January 27, 2021, at ONE: Unbreakable 2. He won the fight via technical knockout in the third round.

Kwon faced former ONE Bantamweight World Champion Kevin Belingon on December 3, 2021 and aired on December 17, 2021, at ONE: Winter Warriors II. He won the fight via knockout in the second round.

Kwon faced Fabrício Andrade on June 3, 2022, at ONE 158. He lost the fight via a body kick knockout in the first round.

Kwon was scheduled to face Mark Abelardo on November 19, 2022, at ONE on Prime Video 4. However, on November 4, it was announced that the bout will be moved to ONE 163. He won the fight via technical knockout in the third round.

Mixed martial arts record

|-
| Win
| align=center| 12–4
| Mark Abelardo 
| TKO (knee and punches)
| ONE 163
| 
| align=center| 3
| align=center| 3:44
| Kallang, Singapore 
|
|-
| Loss
| align=center| 11–4
| Fabrício Andrade
| KO (body kick)
| ONE 158
| 
| align=center| 1
| align=center| 1:02
| Kallang, Singapore 
|
|-
| Win
| align=center| 11–3
| Kevin Belingon
| KO (punch to the body)
| ONE: Winter Warriors II
| 
| align=center| 2
| align=center| 0:52
| Kallang, Singapore 
|
|-
| Win
| align=center| 10–3
| Chen Rui
| TKO (punch to the body)
| ONE: Unbreakable 2
| 
| align=center| 3
| align=center| 0:31
| Kallang, Singapore 
|
|-
| Win
| align=center| 9–3
| Bruno Pucci
| TKO (punches)
| ONE: Inside the Matrix 4
| 
| align=center| 1
| align=center| 2:00
| Kallang, Singapore 
|
|-
| Loss
| align=center| 8–3
| Shoko Sato 
| Submission (rear-naked choke)
| ONE: Fire & Fury
| 
| align=center| 1
| align=center| 4:05
| Pasay, Philippines 
| 
|-
| Win
| align=center| 8–2
| Sunoto Peringkat
| TKO (punches)
| ONE: Century – Part 1
| 
| align=center| 1
| align=center| 1:43
| Tokyo, Japan 
| 
|-
| Loss
| align=center| 7–2
| Koyomi Matsushima
| Decision (unanimous)
| ONE: Legendary Quest
| 
| align=center| 3
| align=center| 5:00
| Shanghai, China
|
|-
| Win
| align=center| 7–1
| Eric Kelly 
| TKO (punches)
| ONE: Roots of Honor
| 
| align=center| 1
| align=center| 0:19
| Pasay, Philippines 
|
|-
| Loss
| align=center| 6–1
| Masakazu Imanari
| Submission (heel hook)
| ONE: Call to Greatness
| 
| align=center| 1
| align=center| 0:53
| Kallang, Singapore 
| 
|-
| Win
| align=center| 6–0
| Anthony Engelen
| TKO (punches)
| ONE: Eternal Glory
| 
| align=center| 1
| align=center| 1:07
| Jakarta, Indonesia 
| 
|-
| Win
| align=center| 5–0
| Toshihiro Shimizu
| Decision (split)
| NeoFight 14
| 
| align=center| 3
| align=center| 5:00
| Gyeonggi, South Korea 
|
|-
| Win
| align=center| 4–0
| Arlan Faurillo
| TKO (punches)
| URCC Bets 7
| 
| align=center| 1
| align=center| N/A
| Manila, Philippines 
|
|-
| Win
| align=center| 3–0
| Sung Hyun Kim
| Submission (rear-naked choke)
| Top FC 8
| 
| align=center| 1
| align=center| 4:10
| Seoul, South Korea 
| 
|-
| Win
| align=center| 2–0
| Keisuke Iwata
| TKO (punches)
| Gladiator Fighting Championship 
| 
| align=center| 1
| align=center| 1:46
| Gifu, Japan
| 
|-
| Win
| align=center| 1–0
| Hirotaka Miyakawa
| TKO (punches)
| Deep 66 Impact
| 
| align=center| 1
| align=center| 0:36
| Tokyo, Japan
|

See also
List of current ONE fighters

References

External links
 Kwon Won Il at ONE

1995 births
Living people
South Korean male mixed martial artists
Bantamweight mixed martial artists
Featherweight mixed martial artists
Lightweight mixed martial artists
Mixed martial artists utilizing taekwondo
People from Daejeon
Sportspeople from Daejeon
South Korean male taekwondo practitioners